Akane Yoshida (born 31 May 1994) is a Japanese weightlifter.

She competed at the  2015 World  Weightlifting Championships, 2016 World University Games, 2016 Asian Weightlifting Championships, 2017 World Weightlifting Championships, 2019 World Weightlifting Championships, and 2020 Asian Weightlifting Championships.

References

External links 
 Athlete: Akane Yoshida | CrossFit Games
 Akane Yoshida (63) - 119kg Clean and Jerk - 2016 University Worlds 
 Yamanashi, Japan. 22nd May, 2016. Akane Yoshida, MAY 22, 2016 - Weightlifting : AFLO SPORT

1994 births
Japanese female weightlifters
Living people
21st-century Japanese women